This list is of all known and predicted scalar, pseudoscalar and vector mesons. See list of particles for a more detailed list of particles found in particle physics.

This article contains a list of mesons, unstable subatomic particles composed of one quark and one antiquark. They are part of the hadron particle family—particles made of quarks. The other members of the hadron family are the baryons—subatomic particles composed of three quarks. The main difference between mesons and baryons is that mesons have integer spin (thus are bosons) while baryons are fermions (half-integer spin). Because mesons are bosons, the Pauli exclusion principle does not apply to them. Because of this, they can act as force mediating particles on short distances, and thus play a part in processes such as the nuclear interaction.

Since mesons are composed of quarks, they participate in both the weak and strong interactions. Mesons with net electric charge also participate in the electromagnetic interaction. They are classified according to their quark content, total angular momentum, parity, and various other properties such as C-parity and G-parity. While no meson is stable, those of lower mass are nonetheless more stable than the most massive mesons, and are easier to observe and study in particle accelerators or in cosmic ray experiments. They are also typically less massive than baryons, meaning that they are more easily produced in experiments, and will exhibit higher-energy phenomena sooner than baryons would. For example, the charm quark was first seen in the J/Psi meson in 1974, and the bottom quark in the upsilon meson in 1977. The top quark (the last and heaviest quark to be discovered to date) was first observed at Fermilab in 1995.

Each meson has a corresponding antiparticle (antimeson) where quarks are replaced by their corresponding antiquarks and vice versa. For example, a positive pion is made of one up quark and one down antiquark; and its corresponding antiparticle, the negative pion, is made of one up antiquark and one down quark. Although tetraquarks with two quarks and two antiquarks can be considered mesons they are not listed here.

The symbols encountered in these lists are: I (isospin), J (total angular momentum), P (parity), C (C-parity), G (G-parity), u (up quark), d (down quark), s (strange quark), c (charm quark), b (bottom quark), Q (charge), B (baryon number), S (strangeness), C (charm), and B′ (bottomness), as well as a wide array of subatomic particles (hover mouse for name).

Summary table
Because this table was initially derived from published results and many of those results were preliminary, as many as 64 of the mesons in the following table may not exist or have the wrong mass or quantum numbers.

Mesons named with the letter "f" are scalar mesons (as opposed to a pseudo-scalar meson), and mesons named with the letter "a" are axial-vector mesons (as opposed to an ordinary vector meson) a.k.a. an isoscalar vector meson, while the letters "b" and "h" refer to axial-vector mesons with positive parity, negative C-parity, and quantum numbers IG of 1+ and 0− respectively.

The, "f", "a", "b" and "h" mesons are not listed in the tables below and their internal structure and quark content is a matter of ongoing investigation.
The particle described in the table above as f0(500) has historically been known by two other names: f0(600) and σ (sigma).

A complete set of meson naming conventions is set forth in a 2017 review article for the Particle Data Group which also contains a table mapping pre-2016 common names to the new Particle Data Group standard naming conventions for XYZ mesons.

Meson properties 
The following lists details for all known and predicted pseudoscalar (JP = 0−) and vector (JP = 1−) mesons.

The properties and quark content of the particles are tabulated below; for the corresponding antiparticles, simply change quarks into antiquarks (and vice versa) and flip the sign of Q, B, S, C, and B′. Particles with † next to their names have been predicted by the standard model but not yet observed. Values in  have not been firmly established by experiments, but are predicted by the quark model and are consistent with the measurements.

Pseudoscalar mesons

[a]  Makeup inexact due to non-zero quark masses.
[b]  PDG reports the resonance width (Γ). Here the conversion τ =  is given instead.
[c] Strong eigenstate. No definite lifetime (see kaon notes below)
[e] Weak eigenstate. Makeup is missing small CP–violating term (see notes on neutral kaons below).

Vector mesons

[f]  PDG reports the resonance width (Γ). Here the conversion τ =  is given instead.
[g]  The exact value depends on the method used. See the given reference for detail.

Notes on neutral kaons
There are two complications with neutral kaons:

However, they are eigenstates of the weak force, which determines how they decay, so these are the particles with definite lifetime.
See CP violation in kaons.

Note that these issues also exist in principle for other neutral flavored mesons; however, the weak eigenstates are considered separate particles only for kaons because of their dramatically different lifetimes.

See also

 List of baryons
 List of particles
 Timeline of particle discoveries

References

Bibliography

External links
Particle Data Group – The Review of Particle Physics (2008)
 Mesons made thinkable, an interactive visualisation allowing physical properties to be compared

Mesons

it:Lista dei mesoni